Distributism is an economic theory asserting that the world's productive assets should be widely owned rather than concentrated. Developed in the late 19th and early 20th centuries, distributism was based upon Catholic social teaching principles, especially Pope Leo XIII's teachings in his encyclical Rerum novarum (1891) and Pope Pius XI in Quadragesimo anno (1931). It has influenced Anglo Christian Democratic movements, and has been recognized as one of many influences on the social market economy.

Distributism views laissez-faire capitalism and state socialism as equally flawed and exploitative, favouring instead small independent craftsmen and producers, or if that is not possible, economic mechanisms such as cooperatives and member-owned mutual organisations as well as small to medium enterprises and large-scale competition law reform such as antitrust regulations. Christian democratic political parties such as the American Solidarity Party have advocated distributism alongside social market economy in their economic policies and party platform.

Overview 
According to distributists, the right to property is a fundamental right, and the means of production should be spread as widely as possible rather than being centralised under the control of the state (statocracy), a few individuals (plutocracy), or corporations (corporatocracy). Therefore, distributism advocates a society marked by widespread property ownership. Cooperative economist Race Mathews argues that such a system is key to creating a just social order.

Distributism has often been described in opposition to both laissez-faire capitalism and state socialism which distributists see as equally flawed and exploitative. Furthermore, some distributists argue that state capitalism and state socialism are the logical conclusion of capitalism as capitalism's concentrated powers eventually capture the state. Thomas Storck argues: "Both socialism and capitalism are products of the European Enlightenment and are thus modernising and anti-traditional forces. In contrast, distributism seeks to subordinate economic activity to human life as a whole, to our spiritual life, our intellectual life, our family life." A few distributists, including Dorothy Day, were influenced by the economic ideas of Pierre-Joseph Proudhon and his mutualist economic theory. The lesser-known anarchist branch of distributism of Day and the Catholic Worker Movement can be considered a form of free-market libertarian socialism due to their opposition to state capitalism and state socialism. 

Some have seen it more as an aspiration, successfully realised in the short term by the commitment to the principles of subsidiarity and solidarity (built into financially independent local cooperatives and small family businesses). However, proponents also cite such periods as the Middle Ages as examples of the long-term historical viability of distributism. Particularly influential in the development of distributist theory were Catholic authors G. K. Chesterton and Hilaire Belloc, the Chesterbelloc, two of distributism's earliest and strongest proponents.

In the early 21st century, Arthur W. Hunt III in The American Conservative and Pascal-Emmanuel Gobry in First Things speculated on Pope Francis's position on distributism after he denounced unfettered capitalism in his apostolic exhortation Evangelii gaudium, in which he stated: "Just as the commandment 'Thou shalt not kill' sets a clear limit in order to safeguard the value of human life, today we also have to say 'thou shalt not' to an economy of exclusion and inequality. Such an economy kills. ... A new tyranny is thus born, invisible and often virtual, which unilaterally and relentlessly imposes its own laws and rules. To all this we can add widespread corruption and self-serving tax evasion, which has taken on worldwide dimensions. The thirst for power and possessions knows no limits."

Background 

The mid-to-late 19th century witnessed an increase in the popularity of political Catholicism across Europe. According to historian Michael A. Riff, a common feature of these movements was opposition to secularism, capitalism, and socialism. In 1891 Pope Leo XIII promulgated Rerum novarum, in which he addressed the "misery and wretchedness pressing so unjustly on the majority of the working class" and spoke of how "a small number of very rich men" had been able to "lay upon the teeming masses of the laboring poor a yoke little better than that of slavery itself". Affirmed in the encyclical was the right of all men to own property, the necessity of a system that allowed "as many as possible of the people to become owners", the duty of employers to provide safe working conditions and sufficient wages, and the right of workers to unionise. Common and government property ownership was expressly dismissed as a means of helping the poor.

Around the start of the 20th century, G. K. Chesterton and Hilaire Belloc drew together the disparate experiences of the various cooperatives and friendly societies in Northern England, Ireland, and Northern Europe into a coherent political theory which specifically advocated widespread private ownership of housing and control of industry through owner-operated small businesses and worker-controlled cooperatives. In the United States in the 1930s, distributism was treated in numerous essays by Chesterton, Belloc and others in The American Review, published and edited by Seward Collins. Pivotal among Belloc's and Chesterton's other works regarding distributism are The Servile State and Outline of Sanity.

Although a majority of distributism's later supporters were not Catholics and many were, in fact, former radical socialists who had become disillusioned with socialism, distributist thought was adopted by the Catholic Worker Movement, conjoining it with the thought of Dorothy Day and Peter Maurin concerning localized and independent communities. It also influenced the thought behind the Antigonish Movement, which implemented cooperatives and other measures to aid the poor in the Canadian Maritimes. Race Mathews has documented its practical implementation in the form of local cooperatives in his 1999 book Jobs of Our Own: Building a Stakeholder Society.

Political spectrum 

The position of distributists, when compared to other political philosophies, is somewhat paradoxical and complicated (see triangulation). Firmly entrenched in an organic but very English Catholicism, advocating culturally traditionalist and agrarian values, directly challenging the precepts of Whig history—Belloc was nonetheless an MP for the Liberal Party, and Chesterton once stated, "As much as I ever did, more than I ever did, I believe in Liberalism. But there was a rosy time of innocence when I believed in Liberals". This liberalism is different from most modern forms, taking influence from William Cobbett and John Ruskin, who combined elements of radicalism, challenging the establishment position, but from a perspective of renovation, not revolution; seeing themselves as trying to restore the traditional liberties of England and her people which had been taken away from them, amongst other things, since the Industrial Revolution.

While converging with some aspects of traditional Toryism, especially an appreciation of the Middle Ages and organic society, there were several points of significant contention. While many Tories were strongly opposed to reform, the distributists, in some instances, saw this not as conserving a legitimate traditional concept of England but, in many cases, entrenching harmful errors and innovations. Belloc was quite explicit in his opposition to Protestantism as a concept and schism from the Catholic Church in general, considering the division of Christendom in the 16th century as one of the most harmful events in European history. On the other hand, elements of Toryism were quite intransigent when it came to the Church of England as the established church, some even spurning their original legitimist ultra-royalist principles in regards to James II to uphold it.

Much of Dorothy L. Sayers' writings on social and economic matters have an affinity with distributism. She may have been influenced by them or have come to similar conclusions on her own. As an Anglican, her reasonings are rooted in the theologies of Creation and Incarnation and slightly differ from the Catholic Chesterton and Belloc.

Economic theory

Private property 

Under such a system, most people would be able to earn a living without having to rely on the use of the property of others to do so. Examples of people earning a living in this way would be farmers who own their land and related machinery, carpenters and plumbers who own their tools, among others. The cooperative approach advances beyond this perspective to recognise that such property and equipment may be co-owned by local communities larger than a family, e.g. partners in a business.

In Rerum novarum, Leo XIII states that people are likely to work harder and with greater commitment if they possess the land on which they labour, which in turn will benefit them and their families as workers will be able to provide for themselves and their household. He puts forward the idea that when men have the opportunity to possess property and work on it, they will "learn to love the very soil which yields in response to the labor of their hands, not only food to eat, but an abundance of the good things for themselves and those that are dear to them". He also states that owning property is beneficial for a person and their family and is, in fact, a right due to God having "given the earth for the use and enjoyment of the whole human race".

G. K. Chesterton presents similar views in his 1910 book, What's Wrong with the World. Chesterton believes that whilst God has limitless capabilities, man has limited abilities in terms of creation. Therefore, man is entitled to own property and treat it as he sees fit, stating: "Property is merely the art of the democracy. It means that every man should have something that he can shape in his own image, as he is shaped in the image of heaven. But because he is not God, but only a graven image of God, his self-expression must deal with limits; properly with limits that are strict and even small." Chesterton summed up his distributist views in the phrase "Three acres and a cow".

According to Belloc, the distributive state (the state which has implemented distributism) contains "an agglomeration of families of varying wealth, but by far the greater number of owners of the means of production". This broader distribution does not extend to all property but only to productive property; that is, that property which produces wealth, namely, the things needed for man to survive. It includes land, tools, and so on. Distributism allows society to have public goods such as parks and transit systems. Distributists accept that wage labour will remain a small part of the economy, with small business owners hiring employees, usually young, inexperienced people.

Guild system 

The economic order envisaged by the early distributist thinkers would involve the return to some guild system. The existence of labour unions does not constitute a realization of this facet of distributist economic order, as labour unions are organized along class lines to promote class interests and frequently class struggle. In contrast, guilds are mixed-class syndicates composed of employers and employees cooperating for mutual benefit, promoting class collaboration. This does not suggest that distributists are against trade unions, however.

Banking and insurance system 
Distributism favours the dissolution of the private banking and insurance system in favour of financial cooperatives and mutuals such as credit unions, building societies, mutual banks and friendly societies. Distributists disagree with the profit-making basis in charging interest. Dorothy Day, for example, suggested abolishing legal enforcement of interest-rate contracts (usury) issued by private banks. It would not entail nationalization but could involve government involvement of some sort.

Antitrust legislation 
Distributism appears to have one of its most significant influences in antitrust legislation in America and Europe, designed to break up monopolies and excessive concentration of market power in one or only a few companies, trusts, interests, or cartels.  Embodying the philosophy explained by Chesterton above, that too much capitalism means too few capitalists, not too many, America's extensive antitrust legislation seeks to prevent the concentration of market power in a given industry into too few hands. Requiring that no company gain too great a share of any market is an example of how distributism has found its way into government policy. This legislation assumes that decentralized economic activity among many different industry participants is better for the economy than having one or a few prominent players in an industry. Note that antitrust regulation does take into account cases when only large companies are viable because of the nature of an industry, as in the case of natural monopolies like electricity distribution. It also accepts that mergers and acquisitions may improve consumer welfare; however, it prefers more economic agents to fewer, which generally improves competition.

Social credit 
Social credit is an interdisciplinary distributive philosophy developed by C. H. Douglas (1879–1952), a British engineer who wrote a book by that name in 1924. It encompasses the fields of economics, political science, history, accounting, and physics. Its policies are designed, according to Douglas, to disperse economic and political power to individuals.

Redistribution of wealth and productive assets 
Distributism requires either direct or indirect distribution of the means of production (productive assets)⁠—in some ideological circles including the redistribution of wealth—to a wide portion of society instead of concentrating it in the hands of a minority of wealthy elites (as seen in its criticism of certain varieties of capitalism) or the hands of the state (as seen in its criticism of certain varieties of communism and socialism). More capitalist-oriented supporters support distributism-influenced social capitalism (also known as a social market economy), while more socialist-oriented supporters support distributism-influenced libertarian socialism. Examples of methods of distributism include direct productive property redistribution, taxation of excessive property ownership, and small-business subsidization.

Social theory

Human family 
G. K. Chesterton considered one's home and family the centrepiece of society. He recognized the family unit and home as centrepieces of living and believed that every man should have their property and home to enable him to raise and support his family. Distributists recognize that strengthening and protecting the family requires that society be nurturing.

Subsidiarity 

Distributism puts great emphasis on the principle of subsidiarity. This principle holds that no larger unit (whether social, economic, or political) should perform a function that a smaller unit can perform. In Quadragesimo anno, Pope Pius XI provided the classical statement of the principle: "Just as it is gravely wrong to take from individuals what they can accomplish by their own initiative and industry and give it to the community, so also it is an injustice and at the same time a grave evil and disturbance of right order to assign to a greater and higher association what lesser and subordinate organizations can do".

Social security 
The Democratic Labour Party of Australia espouses distributism and does not hold the view of favouring the elimination of social security who, for instance, wish to "[r]aise the level of student income support payments to the Henderson poverty line".

The American Solidarity Party has a platform of favouring an adequate social security system, stating: "We advocate for social safety nets that adequately provide for the material needs of the most vulnerable in society".

Geopolitical theory

Political order 
Distributism does not favour one political order over another (political accidentalism). While some distributists such as Dorothy Day have been anarchists, it should be remembered that most Chestertonian distributists are opposed to the mere concept of anarchism. Chesterton thought that distributism would benefit from the discipline that theoretical analysis imposes and that distributism is best seen as a widely encompassing concept inside of which any number of interpretations and perspectives can fit. This concept should fit a political system broadly characterized by widespread ownership of productive property.

Political parties 
In the United States, the American Solidarity Party generally adheres to Distributist principles as its economic model. The Brazilian political party, Humanist Party of Solidarity, is a distributist party, alongside the National Distributist Party in England, and the Democratic Labour Party in Australia. Ross Douthat and Reihan Salam view their Grand New Party, a roadmap for revising the Republican Party in the United States, as "a book written in the distributist tradition". The Pirate Party of Romania is also considered to be a distributist party.

War 
Distributists usually use just war theory in determining whether a war should be fought or not. Historical positions of distributist thinkers provide insight into a distributist position on war. Belloc and Chesterton opposed British imperialism in general and explicitly opposed the Second Boer War, but they supported British involvement in World War I.

On the other hand, prominent distributists such as Dorothy Day and those involved in the Catholic Worker Movement were/are strict pacifists, even condemning involvement in World War II at much personal cost.

Influence

E. F. Schumacher 
Distributism is known to have influenced the economist E. F. Schumacher, a convert to Catholicism.

Mondragon Corporation 
The Mondragon Corporation, based in the Basque Country in a region of Spain and France, was founded by a Catholic priest, Father José María Arizmendiarrieta, who seems to have been influenced by the same Catholic social and economic teachings that inspired Belloc, Chesterton, Father Vincent McNabb, and the other founders of distributism.

Guild of St Joseph and St Dominic 
Distributist ideas were put into practice by The Guild of St Joseph and St Dominic, a group of artists and craftsmen who established a community in Ditchling, Sussex, England, in 1920, with the motto "Men rich in virtue studying beautifulness living in peace in their houses". The guild sought to recreate an idealised medieval lifestyle in the manner of the Arts and Crafts Movement. It survived for almost 70 years until 1989.

Big Society 
The Big Society was the flagship policy idea of the 2010 UK Conservative Party general election manifesto. Some distributists claim that the rhetorical marketing of this policy was influenced by aphorisms of the distributist ideology and promotes distributism. It purportedly formed a part of the legislative programme of the Conservative – Liberal Democrat Coalition Agreement. The stated aim was "to create a climate that empowers local people and communities, building a big society that will 'take power away from politicians and give it to people.'" The idea of the Big Society was suggested by Steve Hilton, who worked as director of strategy for David Cameron during the Coalition government before moving on to live and work in California. Big Society gradually declined as an instrument of government policy throughout the 2010–2015 government.

List of Distributist Parties

Current 

 Australia - Democratic Labour Party
 Romania - Pirate Party Romania
 United Kingdom - National Distributist Party
 United States - American Solidarity Party

Historical

Notable distributists

Historical 

 Herbert Agar
 Hilaire Belloc

 L. Brent Bozell Jr.
 Cecil Chesterton
 G. K. Chesterton
 Seward Collins
 Dorothy Day
 Adam Doboszyński
 Peter Maurin
 Horacio de la Costa
 J. P. de Fonseka
 Eric Gill
 Douglas Hyde
 Saunders Lewis
 Vincent McNabb
 Arthur Penty
 Hilary Pepler
 Óscar Romero
 William Purcell Witcutt
 Dorothy L. Sayers
 J. R. R. Tolkien

Contemporary 

 Dale Ahlquist
 Phillip Blond
 Allan C. Carlson
 Charles A. Coulombe
  Sean Domencic 
 Bill Kauffman
 Race Mathews
 Joseph Pearce
 
 Douglas Rushkoff
 John Sharpe
 John C. Médaille
 Richard Williamson

Key texts 
 Rerum novarum (1891), papal encyclical by Pope Leo XIII.
 Quadragesimo anno (1931), papal encyclical by Pope Pius XI.
 Centesimus Annus (1991), papal encyclical by Pope John Paul II.
 Evangelii gaudium (2013), apostolic exhortation by Pope Francis.
 What's Wrong with the World (1910) by G. K. Chesterton  – eText.
 The Outline of Sanity (1927) by G. K. Chesterton.
 Utopia of Usurers (1917) by G. K. Chesterton.
 The Servile State (1912) by Hilaire Belloc.
 An Essay on The Restoration of Property (1936) by Hilaire Belloc .
 Jobs of Our Own (1999) by Race Mathews .

See also 

 Related concepts
 Agrarianism
 Bioregionalism
 Catholic social teaching
 Distributed economy
 Distributive justice
 Localism (politics)
 Market socialism
 Mutual aid (organization theory)
 Predistribution
 Subsidiarity

 Similar positions
 Anarcho-syndicalism
 Christian democracy
 Gandhian economics
 Georgism
 Guild socialism
 Mutualism (economic theory)
 Traditionalist conservatism
 Ujamaa

References

Further reading 
 Boyle, David. Back to the Land: Distributism and the politics of life Steyning: The Real Press, 2019. 
 Cooney, Anthony. Distributism. 
 Kurland, Norman. The Just Third Way: Basic Principles of Economic and Social Justice, Center for Economic and Social Justice
 Sagar, S. Distributism. 
 Shaw v Chesterton: a Debate between George Bernard Shaw and G. K. Chesterton. 
 "Union Square Speech" by Dorothy Day
 Distributism as a means of achieving third way economics, a paper for the Secular Party of Australia written by Richard Howard of the Humanist Society of New South Wales
 Pabst, Adrian. "Pope Benedict's call for a civil economy". The Guardian, 20 July 2009.

External links 
 The Distributist Review

 
Anti-capitalism
Anti-communism
Centre-left ideologies
Economic ideologies
Political theories
Pope Leo XIII
Power sharing
Syncretic political movements
Mixed economies